Bellewood is an unincorporated community located in Humphreys County, Mississippi.

Bellewood is located on the former Illinois Central Railroad and was once home to a general store, grocery store, and sawmill.

A post office operated under the name Bellewood from 1902 to 1925.

Prior to the creation of Humphreys County, Bellewood was located in Washington County.

References

Unincorporated communities in Humphreys County, Mississippi
Unincorporated communities in Mississippi